"(I'm) Stranded" is the debut single released by Australian punk rock band the Saints. Issued in September 1976, it has been cited as "one of the iconic singles of the era", and pre-dated vinyl debuts by contemporary punk acts such as the Sex Pistols, Buzzcocks, The Damned and The Clash. In 2001, it was voted among the Top 30 Australian Songs of all time by APRA.

Written by guitarist Ed Kuepper and vocalist Chris Bailey, the single was originally released on the band's own Fatal Records label, with an initial pressing of 500 copies. In the UK, where the single was at first available only on import, Sounds magazine called it "single of this and every week. ... The singing's flat and disinterested, the guitars are on full stun. ... It's fabulous." In 2007, Australian Musician magazine voted this the fourth most significant moment in the history of Australian pop/rock.

On the strength of the single, The Saints were signed in November 1976 to a three-album deal by EMI in the UK. The single was then released in the U.K. on 31 December 1976.  The band's first LP was also called (I'm) Stranded. As well as featuring on their debut album, both "(I'm) Stranded" and the single's B-side, "No Time", appeared on a split EP with Stanley Frank in 1977.

In 2007, "(I'm) Stranded" was added to the National Film and Sound Archive's Sounds of Australia registry.

History
The Saints were formed in Brisbane in 1973, initially calling themselves Kid Galahad and the Eternals. They are considered to be one of the first and most influential punk groups. The Saints rehearsed in the front room of the rented house on Petrie terrace, Brisbane, which happened to be opposite the local police headquarters. By 1975, contemporaneous with the Ramones, The Saints were employing the fast tempos, raucous vocals and "buzzsaw" guitar that characterised early punk rock. Guitarist Ed Kuepper explained that they played faster and faster as they were nervous in front of audiences. The police would often break up their performances, and arrests were frequent. They found it difficult to get bookings in Brisbane and so formed their own promotion company, their own club (Hay's place became the 76 Club) and their own record label.

Their first single, "(I'm) Stranded", released in September 1976, came out ahead of the debut records by better-known punk acts like the Sex Pistols and The Clash. The film clip for the song was directed by Russell Mulcahy and filmed at an abandoned terrace house located in the suburb of Paddington. The Saints distributed the single themselves, on their own Fatal label, sending it to overseas record companies and magazines. In Great Britain, Sounds reviewer Jonh Ingham called it the "single of this and every week". He continued,

There's a tendency to blabber mindlessly about this single, it's so bloody incredible [...] for some reason Australian record companies think the band lack commercial potential. What a bunch of idiots. You like Quo or The Ramones? This pounds them into the dirt. Hear it once and you'll never forget it. The singing's flat and disinterested, the guitars are on full stun. There's no such thing as a middle eight. It's fabulous.

The song was played by influential DJ John Peel in a special punk-themed edition of his BBC Radio 1 programme, broadcast on 10 December 1976. Bob Geldof of The Boomtown Rats later said, "Rock music in the Seventies was changed by three bands—the Sex Pistols, the Ramones and The Saints". EMI Records in Sydney was contacted by its London head office and told to sign the punk band from Brisbane. The Saints resisted being re-modelled into the English punk look and were generally ignored by the Australian press at the time, which reported that "a sinister new teenage pop cult, based on sex, sadism and violence, is sweeping Britain." They relocated first to Sydney and then to London, where they were received with excitement on their first regional tour. They did not share the spiky-topped, safety-pinned style of the leading UK punk groups and preferred to be described as "gutsy realists". Kuepper recalled that, nevertheless, they were swept up in the same punk packaging:

The band was a full thing by 1974. Two and a half years later, this incredibly fashionable movement comes along, only an arsehole would have associated himself with that.

On the strength of the single, The Saints were signed in November 1976 to a three-album deal by EMI in the UK. Their first LP was also called (I'm) Stranded. As well as featuring on their debut album, both "(I'm) Stranded" and the single's B-side, "No Time", appeared on a split EP with Stanley Frank in 1977.

The song "I'm Stranded" is the theme song for the Australian TV series "Spirited," about a British punk rocker who disappeared in 1982 and whose ghost has appeared in Australia in the late 2010s.

Track listing
Both songs written by Ed Kuepper and Chris Bailey.
"(I'm) Stranded" – 3:25
"No Time" – 2:45

Charts

Personnel
The Saints members
Chris Bailey — vocals
Kym Bradshaw — bass
Ivor Hay — drums
Ed Kuepper — guitar

Recording details
Producer – The Saints, Richard Coe, Mark Moffatt

Art work
Cover art — Savage Pencil

References

External links
 Listen to a clip from "(I'm) Stranded" and read more about it on australianscreen online
 "(I'm) Stranded" was added to the Sounds of Australia Registry in 2007
 [ Allmusic review]

1976 songs
1976 debut singles
APRA Award winners
The Saints (Australian band) songs
Songs written by Ed Kuepper
Songs written by Chris Bailey (musician)